Yoyo Ng Tsz Yau (born 24 April 1998) is a Hong Kong badminton player. She started playing badminton at aged 5, and in 2013, she competed in the women's doubles event with Yeung Nga Ting. In 2017, she reach the mixed doubles semi final round at the Malaysia Masters, and in November 2017, she and Yeung won the senior tournament at the Tata Open India International tournament.

Career 
Ng competes in both women's and mixed doubles and has won tournaments with several different partners. In 2014, she competed at the Summer Youth Olympics in Nanjing, China. She won the mixed doubles gold medal together with partner Cheam June Wei.

She won the 2018 Hyderabad Open title with Yuen Sin Ying after beating Vivian Hoo and Yap Cheng Wen of Malaysia. She also partnered with Tang Chun Man for a brief period and won the 2019 Lingshui China Masters.

In 2022, she participated in the Taipei Open and reached the finals in both women's and mixed doubles. She won both finals partnered with Lee Chun Hei in mixed doubles and Tsang Hiu Yan in women's doubles.

Achievements

Youth Olympic Games 
Mixed doubles

BWF World Tour (4 titles) 
The BWF World Tour, which was announced on 19 March 2017 and implemented in 2018, is a series of elite badminton tournaments sanctioned by the Badminton World Federation (BWF). The BWF World Tour is divided into levels of World Tour Finals, Super 1000, Super 750, Super 500, Super 300, and the BWF Tour Super 100.

Women's doubles

Mixed doubles

BWF International Challenge/Series (6 titles, 3 runners-up) 
Women's doubles

Mixed doubles

  BWF International Challenge tournament
  BWF International Series/European Circuit tournament

References

External links 
 

 

1998 births
Living people
Hong Kong female badminton players
Badminton players at the 2014 Summer Youth Olympics
Badminton players at the 2018 Asian Games
Asian Games competitors for Hong Kong
21st-century Hong Kong women